Seagle Air was a charter airline based in Trenčín, Slovakia. It had its operations out of M. R. Štefánik Airport in Bratislava, with a second base in Prague. The airline operated non-scheduled air services, including passenger, cargo and mail charter flights to domestic and international destinations.

Established in 1995 as private flying school Seagle Air later added cargo and mail flights, in 2006 VIP transport and in 2007 charter flights. In 2007 it also took over a large portion of employees and offices from the bankrupted Slovak Airlines.

The company also operated a flight training organization, where future pilots could receive their Airline Transport Pilot License flying on Katana Diamond DA20, DA40 and DA42 Twin Star aircraft. The flight school was located in a bed and breakfast style accommodation facility at Trenčín Airport. Seagle Air-FTO continues to operate normally.

Financial performance 
On 31 December 2008, Seagle Air had an overdue debt of 230,000 Euros on social insurance of its employees. This overdue debt increased to 333,000 Euros at the end of March 2009. At the end of June 2009, Seagle Air has no more debts towards social insurance. Nevertheless, on 23 October 2009, Seagle Air ceased all its services due to finance problems. All passenger aircraft were returned to their lessors. On January 25, 2010, the media announced bankruptcy of the company.

Fleet 
The Seagle Air fleet consisted of the following aircraft when it was shut down:

The airline previously also owned Seagle Jet.

In October 2008, the average age of the Seagle Air Boeing 737 fleet was 18.7 years.

References

External links 

Seagle Air
Seagle Air aircraft

Defunct airlines of Slovakia
Airlines established in 1995
Airlines disestablished in 2009
Slovakian companies established in 1995